Hans Georg Stehlin (1870–1941) was a Swiss paleontologist and geologist.

Stehlin specialized in vertebrate paleontology, particularly the study of Cenozoic mammals. He published numerous scientific papers on primates and ungulates. He was president of the commission of the Natural History Museum of Basel.

In 1910 Stehlin coined the term Grande Coupure to refer to the extinction event which occurred 33.9 millions of years ago, which defines the Eocene-Oligocene limit. It originated a huge change in organisms, especially the mammals of Europe.

Stehlin is commemorated in the scientific name of a species of lizard, Gallotia stehlini.

References

Bibliography

External links

Stehlin, H.G. (1903). "Die Säugetiere des schweizerischen Eocaens: critischer Catalog der Materialien " - Stehlin's paper on some mammals of the Eocene. (in German).

1870 births
1941 deaths
Swiss paleontologists
20th-century Swiss geologists